Season nineteen of Dancing with the Stars premiered on September 15, 2014.

On November 25, actor Alfonso Ribeiro and Witney Carson were crowned the champions, while Duck Dynasty star Sadie Robertson and Mark Ballas finished in second place, and Pretty Little Liars actress Janel Parrish and Valentin Chmerkovskiy finished in third.

Cheryl Burke, who was featured on every season of the show except the first, decided to leave when her contract expired at the end of this season. She would later return in season 23.

Cast

Couples
Twelve professional partners were revealed on August 13, 2014, on Good Morning America by Cheryl Burke, Tony Dovolani, Karina Smirnoff, and Valentin Chmerkovskiy. Sharna Burgess was announced as the thirteenth pro on August 27, 2014. The celebrity partners were revealed on Good Morning America on September 4, 2014.

Henry Byalikov did not return as a pro this season, but returned to the show's dance troupe. Allison Holker, a contestant on season two of So You Think You Can Dance and a nominee for a Primetime Emmy Award for Outstanding Choreography alongside Derek Hough in 2013, made her debut as a professional this season, along with season 18 troupe member and former Strictly Come Dancing champion pro Artem Chigvintsev and South African Latin American ballroom champion Keo Motsepe. Other members of the troupe included Lindsay Arnold, Sasha Farber, and Jenna Johnson, all of whom had performed in past seasons. Gleb Savchenko performed with the current troupe members in the season premiere episode.

Host and judges
Tom Bergeron returned as host alongside Erin Andrews. Len Goodman, Carrie Ann Inaba and Bruno Tonioli all returned as judges, while former professional and two-time champion Julianne Hough joined the panel as the permanent fourth judge. Ray Chew also returned as bandleader. Leah Remini filled in as co-host on October 20, due to Erin Andrews' commitment with Fox to cover the 2014 World Series. Comedian and actor Kevin Hart filled in as a celebrity guest judge on September 29. On October 13, singer Jessie J was a guest judge, and on October 20, rapper Pitbull was also a guest judge.

Scoring charts

Notes

 : This was the lowest score of the week.
 : This was the highest score of the week.
 :  This couple finished in first place.
 :  This couple finished in second place.
 :  This couple finished in third place.
 :  This couple was in the bottom two, but was not eliminated.
 :  This couple was eliminated.

Highest and lowest scoring performances
The best and worst performances in each dance according to the judges' 40-point scale are as follows:

Couples' highest and lowest scoring dances
Scores are based upon a potential 40-point maximum.

Weekly scores
Individual judges' scores in the charts below (given in parentheses) are listed in this order from left to right: Carrie Ann Inaba, Len Goodman, Julianne Hough, Bruno Tonioli.

Week 1: Premiere Night
Couples performed the cha-cha-cha, foxtrot, or jive. Couples are listed in the order they performed.

Week 2: My Jam Monday
Couples performed one unlearned dance to some of their favorite songs; jazz, rumba, salsa, and samba were introduced. Couples are listed in the order they performed.

Week 3: Movie Night
Individual judges scores in the chart below (given in parentheses) are listed in this order from left to right: Carrie Ann Inaba, Kevin Hart, Julianne Hough, Bruno Tonioli.

Couples performed one unlearned dance to famous film songs. The Argentine tango, contemporary, paso doble, quickstep, tango, Viennese waltz, and waltz were introduced. Couples are listed in the order they performed.

Week 4: Most Memorable Year Night
Individual judges scores in the chart below (given in parentheses) are listed in this order from left to right: Carrie Ann Inaba, Julianne Hough, Bruno Tonioli, America's Score.

Couples performed one unlearned dance to celebrate the most memorable year of their lives. For the first time in the show's history, the general public was able to score each dance on a scale from 1 to 10, with an averaged score counting alongside the scores given by the three judges. Couples are listed in the order they performed.

Week 5: Switch-Up Night
Individual judges scores in the chart below (given in parentheses) are listed in this order from left to right: Carrie Ann Inaba, Jessie J, Julianne Hough, Bruno Tonioli.

Couples performed one unlearned dance with a different partner selected by the general public. All dance styles were new to the season. Couples are listed in the order they performed. No elimination took place at the end of the night.

Week 6: Pitbull Joins The Party
Individual judges scores in the chart below (given in parentheses) are listed in this order from left to right: Carrie Ann Inaba, Pitbull, Julianne Hough, Bruno Tonioli.

Couples performed one unlearned dance to guest judge Pitbull's favorite tracks. Couples are listed in the order they performed. 

Leah Remini filled in as co-host for Erin Andrews.

Week 7: Halloween Night
Couples performed one unlearned dance and a team dance to Halloween themes and songs. Couples are listed in the order they performed.  

Len Goodman returned to the judging panel after a 4-week absence.

Week 8: Dynamic Duos Night
Couples performed one unlearned dance honoring famous popular culture pairings. The couple with the highest score earned an immunity from elimination, while the rest of the couples participated in dance-offs for extra points. Couples are listed in the order they performed.

Week 9: America's Choice Night
Couples performed a routine to an unlearned dance and song that was chosen by the public, as well as a trio dance involving an eliminated pro or a member of the dance troupe. Couples are listed in the order they performed.

Week 10: Plugged/Unplugged Night
Couples performed two unlearned dances to the same song, with one version being the original track, and the other being an acoustic version. Couples are listed in the order they performed.

Week 11: Finals
On the first night, the finalists performed a previous routine chosen by the judges and a freestyle dance. On the second night, the couples danced a fusion dance of two previously learned dance styles. Couples are listed in the order they performed.

Night 1

Night 2

Dance chart
The celebrities and professional partners danced one of these routines for each corresponding week:
 Week 1 (Premiere Night): One unlearned dance 
 Week 2 (My Jam Monday): One unlearned dance
 Week 3 (Movie Night): One unlearned dance
 Week 4 (Most Memorable Year Night): One unlearned dance 
 Week 5 (Switch-Up Night): One new dance style
 Week 6 (Pitbull Joins The Party): One unlearned dance
 Week 7 (Halloween Night): One unlearned dance & team dances
 Week 8 (Dynamic Duos Night): One unlearned dance & dance-offs
 Week 9 (America's Choice Night): One unlearned dance & trio dance
 Week 10 (Plugged/Unplugged Night): Two unlearned dances
 Week 11 (Finals, Night 1): Judge's choice & freestyle
 Week 11 (Finals, Night 2): Fusion dance

Notes

 :  This was the highest scoring dance of the week.
 :  This was the lowest scoring dance of the week.
 :  This couple gained bonus points for winning this dance-off.
 :  This couple gained no bonus points for losing this dance-off.
 :  This couple earned immunity and did not have to compete in the dance-off.
 :  This couple danced, but received no scores.

Ratings

Notes

References

External links

Dancing with the Stars (American TV series)
2014 American television seasons